A new Lebanese cabinet led by  Prime Minister Hassan Diab was formed in Lebanon on 21 January 2020, after agreement was reached by the heads of the involved political parties after nearly three months. The already delegitimized government assigned Diab and his new cabinet, despite ongoing public outrage against the new cabinet and citizen requests for a competent, independent, and technocratic government. The marketing campaign by the authoritative powers around the new cabinet were mired by obvious untruths such as Diab claiming to have met "representatives of the thawra" but turned out to be regime supporters or the regime using the term "techno-political" to describe the new cabinet in order to justify the majority partisan appointments (as seen in the graph below). Diab was appointed prime minister by President Michel Aoun following the resignation of Saad Hariri following the 2019–20 Lebanese protests, that started in October 2019. On 10 August 2020, the government resigned following public anger over the 2020 Beirut explosions on 4 August but continues to govern as a caretaker government.

The cabinet, which was composed of twenty ministers, appointed six female members to improve the gender ratio and cited the ratio of male to female members as "more than any previous Lebanese government".

Beirut port explosion
On 10 August 2020, the entire cabinet resigned following public anger over the 2020 Beirut explosions on 4 August that killed more than 200 people. The cabinet continues to govern in a caretaker capacity until a new government is formed.

In December 2020, Lebanon's outgoing Prime Minister Diab and three former ministers were charged with negligence over the Beirut port explosion. The former ministers were former finance minister Ali Hassan Khalil, Ghazi Zeiter and Youssef Fenianos, both former ministers of public works. Zeitar was transport and public works minister in 2014, followed by Fenianos in 2016, who held the job until the beginning of 2020. Khalil was finance minister in 2014, 2016 and until 2020. Ali Hassan Khalil and Youssef Fenianos were both sanctioned by the US treasury for corruption, misappropriation of funds, and empowering Hezbollah - labelled as a terrorist organization by several nations.

Composition

References 

Cabinets of Lebanon
Cabinets established in 2020
2020 establishments in Lebanon
Cabinets disestablished in 2020
2020 disestablishments in Lebanon
Michel Aoun